Jack Bushnell Hanna (born January 2, 1947) is a retired American zookeeper and a former director emeritus of the Columbus Zoo and Aquarium. "Jungle Jack" was director of the zoo from 1978 to 1992, and is viewed as largely responsible for elevating its quality and reputation.  His media appearances, particularly with Johnny Carson, David Letterman, James Corden, Good Morning America, and Maury Povich have made him one of the most notable animal experts in the United States.

Early life
Hanna was born in Knoxville, Tennessee. He grew up on his family's farm and volunteered for the family veterinarian, Dr. Roberts, when he was 11. He attended The Kiski School, an all-boys boarding school in Saltsburg, Pennsylvania, for high school, graduating in 1965. He majored in business and political science at Muskingum College in New Concord, Ohio, where he got in trouble for keeping ducks in his dorm room and a donkey in a shed behind his fraternity house (The M.A.C.E. Club). In his senior year, Hanna married Suzi, a cheerleader at Muskingum, and graduated in 1968.

Career

Although unable to secure zoning as a zoo for his family's farm, Hanna and Suzi opened a pet shop and petting zoo. In 1972, a three-year-old boy was mauled by a lion at Hanna's farm after the boy slipped past the protective barrier and stuck his arm through the enclosure fence, subsequently losing the arm. Hanna settled a later lawsuit out of court, shut down the petting zoo, and moved his family to Florida.

He worked for a wildlife adventure company and directed the small Central Florida Zoo and Botanical Gardens from 1973 to 1975. When he was offered the position at the Columbus Zoo in 1978, one of the reasons he accepted was because he believed Columbus Children's Hospital had the best treatment available for his daughter Julie's leukemia. She recovered by the age of six, although she needed to have a brain tumor removed later in life.
At the time he became the zoo's director, the grounds of the zoo were unkempt and the facilities run down. Hanna initially struck many as a "zealous" zoo director, often traveling around the zoo grounds after closing to personally pick up trash.  He also realized the importance of increasing the profile of the Columbus Zoo in central Ohio to get more public support and funding, and the "everyman"-seeming Hanna proved to be very well-suited to public relations for the zoo. From 1981 to 1983, Hanna hosted a local television program, "Hanna's Ark", which aired on the local CBS affiliate in Columbus, WBNS. Hanna's live animal demonstrations on Good Morning America and David Letterman's talk show incarnations brought national attention to the Columbus Zoo as well as to Hanna himself. Over the course of Hanna's tenure as director, the zoo made the transition from cage-like enclosures to habitat environments, and the grounds were significantly expanded. The annual attendance of the Columbus Zoo increased by over 400% during this time. Hanna was named director emeritus of the Columbus Zoo and Aquarium in 1992.

Hanna published his autobiography, Monkeys on the Interstate, in 1989. He has published many books for children as well.  He has hosted the syndicated television shows Jack Hanna's Animal Adventures, Jack Hanna's Into the Wild, and Jack Hanna's Wild Countdown, all produced and distributed by Litton Entertainment.  Hanna also occasionally contributed commentary as an animal expert on various local and national news programs, and has done guest spots on other shows such as Larry King Live, Nancy Grace, Maury, and The Hollywood Squares. On September 25, 2003, Jack made a special guest appearance on an episode of Blue's Clues (season 5, episode 35, "Animals in Our House?"). He was also named one of the "50 Most Beautiful People" by People magazine in 1996. Hanna also appeared in Neal McCoy's 2005 music video for "Billy's Got His Beer Goggles On" with a hyacinth macaw, a sloth and an albino burmese python. Hanna, along with Emmy Award-winning musician Mark Frye, released an album through Virgin Records in 1996 entitled Jack Hanna's World.

He was granted honorary doctorates from Muskingum University, Otterbein College, Capital University, and Ohio University.

On October 19, 2011, Hanna assisted Ohio police in tracking down several escaped exotic animals near Zanesville, Ohio. Hanna provided police assistance with expertise in tracking down the animals, which included lions, leopards, wolves, primates, bears, and eighteen tigers.

In May 2018 at the Los Angeles Zoo's annual Beastly Ball, Hanna received the Tom Mankiewicz Leadership Award for his work in conservation.

In June 2020, Hanna announced his retirement from the Columbus Zoo effective at the end of the year.

Criticism of Copenhagen Zoo giraffe culling
Jack Hanna criticized the killing of the healthy eighteen-month-old giraffe Marius in Copenhagen Zoo, which was killed rather than offered for adoption after being classified as genetically overrepresented in zoo breeding programs. Hanna said this would not happen in an American zoo. Soon after, he raised money to prevent a separate male giraffe culling at the Jyllands Park Zoo, which is also in Denmark, where zookeepers had said they might kill the giraffe if they brought in some females for breeding. Hanna said he was willing to provide refuge including transport for this giraffe. The Jyllands Park Zoo later stated that they did not actually plan to bring in a new female or to kill the male that was at the facility.

Health 
In April 2021, Hanna's family announced that he had been diagnosed with dementia, subsequently thought to be Alzheimer's disease, and would make no further public appearances. His daughters stated that "his condition has progressed much faster in the last few months than any of us could have anticipated".

Allegation of improper animal trading practices 
In August 2021, filmmakers of an independent documentary film alleged that the Columbus Zoo  and Hanna as its former director had misrepresented where some animals had been acquired from or had been transferred to and that the zoo had been dealing with unaccredited private facilities that, in some cases, may not have provided appropriate animal care. Zoo officials responded by cutting ties with most of the unaccredited private institutions named in the documentary. Former zoo official Suzi Rapp defended one of the private institutions, saying that the lack of certification of the facility does not necessarily indicate that the institution is not a good facility. Hanna's family released a statement saying they had not seen the documentary, could not speak for him, and could not consult him on the matter due to the effects of his dementia.

References

External links

1947 births
20th-century American zoologists
21st-century American zoologists
American people of Lebanese descent
Living people
Muskingum University alumni
Otterbein University alumni
People from Bigfork, Montana
People from Columbus, Ohio
People from Knoxville, Tennessee
People with Alzheimer's disease
Television personalities from Ohio
The Kiski School alumni
Zoo directors